Woombye is a town and locality in the Sunshine Coast Region, Queensland, Australia.

Geography 
The name is derived from words from the local Aboriginal language - a place of black snake, or (wambai) black myrtle or axe handle made from black myrtle. 

The Bruce Highway forms the eastern boundary of the locality. The North Coast railway line runs from north to south through the western part of the locality; the town is centred around the Woombye railway station in the west of the locality.

Woombye is accessible by Translink trains and buses. There are numerous rail services departing for Brisbane daily.

The small township of Woombye is surrounded by what were once pineapple farms, which today are acreage properties and gated communities. The first pineapple farm was owned and operated by Hugh and Alice Moorhouse, located on Moorhouse Road, which overlooks the township. The Woombye Light Horse Memorial is also named after MAJ Hugh Vardy Moorhouse (2 Feb 1903 – 11 Oct 1993).

Woombye–Montville Road exits to the south.

History
The town has its roots in a settlement first known as Middle Camp, and later Cobb's Camp. It was established in 1868 as a staging depot and hotel for Cobb & Co stagecoaches at the halfway point on the road between Brisbane and Gympie, after the discovery of gold at Gympie.

Cobbs Camp Provisional School opened on 17 August 1885.

The town was renamed as Woombye in the 1880s. The name Woombye comes from the Kabi word wambai meaning black myrtle tree, which was used for handles for axes. The school was renamed Woombye State School in 1892.

In 1891 the North Coast railway from Landsborough to Yandina was opened, and it became a rail centre until 1914.

Woombye Pub was opened in 1900 as The Criterion Hotel, a hotel which stands on the site as a pub.

The Woombye War Memorial was unveiled on 18 June 1925 by the Queensland Governor, Matthew Nathan.

The Woombye branch of the Queensland Country Women's Association had formed before 1930.

In 1977, a preschool was added to Woombye State School.

On 5 February 1979 the Christian Outreach College (Sunshine Coast) was established by the Nambour Christian Outreach Centre on a  pineapple farm. The church and school were later renamed Suncoast Church and Suncoast Christian College respectively. In 2004, an adjoining  pineapple farm was purchased to expand the school.

On 29 January 1980, Nambour Christian College was established with 36 students by the families of the New Life Assembly of God Nambour church. The name was changed to Nambour Christian College in 1992.

Education 
Woombye State School is a government primary (Prep-6) school for boys and girls at 95 Pine Grove Road. In 2017, the school had an enrolment of 506 students with 41 teachers (32 full-time equivalent) and 21 non-teaching staff (14 full-time equivalent). The school includes a special education program.

Suncoast Christian College is a private primary and secondary (Prep-12) school for boys and girls at the corner of Schubert & Kiel Mountain Roads. In 2017, the school had an enrolment of 803 students with 67 teachers (57 full-time equivalent) and 70 non-teaching staff (42 full-time equivalent).

Nambour Christian College is a private primary and secondary (Prep-12) school for boys and girls at McKenzie Road. In 2017, the school had an enrolment of 1,131 students with 87 teachers (80 full-time equivalent) and 95 non-teaching staff (59 full-time equivalent).

There are no government secondary schools in Woombye, but there are government secondary schools in neighbouring Nambour and Burnside.

Amenities 
Woombye is home to one of the longest established soccer clubs on the Sunshine Coast, the Woombye Snakes.

Visitor attractions 
Woombye is home to The Big Pineapple, a tourist attraction which is one of Australia's big things.

Heritage listings
Woombye has a number of heritage-listed sites, including:
 Nambour Connection Road: North Coast Roadside Rest Areas
 Nambour Connection Road: The Big Pineapple (former Sunshine Plantation)

See also
Blackall Range road network

References

External links 

 
 Town map of Woombye, 1979

Towns in Queensland
Suburbs of the Sunshine Coast Region
Localities in Queensland